Shaun Nikolas Tsakiris (born February 16, 1979) is a retired American soccer player who last played as a midfielder for the Rochester Rhinos in USL Pro.

Club career
Tsakiris was picked by New England Revolution in 2001 MLS SuperDraft from UCLA.

In 2002, he signed with Rochester Rhinos, where he played for three seasons in USL A-League.

International career
Tsakiris was part of the United States U20 that participated in the 1999 FIFA World Youth Championship.

Managerial career
Tsakiris is currently Technical Director at Los Gatos United Soccer Club.

References

External links
 
 Deanzaforce.org
 Soccerstats player profile
 Los Gatos United

1979 births
Living people
American soccer players
UCLA Bruins men's soccer players
New England Revolution players
Rochester New York FC players
Soccer players from California
A-League (1995–2004) players
USL First Division players
United States men's under-20 international soccer players
New England Revolution draft picks
Association football midfielders
American people of Greek descent